Glen Edwards may refer to:
Glen Edwards (pilot) (1918–1948), U.S. Air Force test pilot
Glen Edwards (safety) (born 1947), American football safety
Glen "Turk" Edwards (1907–1973), American football tackle and coach, member of Pro Football Hall of Fame

See also
Glynn Edwards (1931–2018), English actor